Giuseppe Marzotto (born 30 January 1944, in Arzignano) is a former Italian international motorcycle speedway rider.

Career
Marzotto began competing in scooter gymkhanas at the age of 16, riding under the pseudonym "Charlie Brown" because his parents were opposed to him entering in such events.  He won the Trofeo Nazionale Gincane four times from 1966–1969. When he was 19 he took up motocross and rode until 1974 before deciding to focus on speedway. His first speedway meeting was at Lonigo in 1968. In 1974 he finished runnerup in the Italian Speedway Championship and the following year won the title. In 1976 he joined the Wolverhampton Wolves and rode in 11 meetings in the British League. In 1977 he rode in Germany for the MSC Olching Club. He later rode for the Moto Club La Favorita.  During his career he won the Italian Championship five times and represented Italy in team and best pairs events. He also rode in Argentina and New Zealand. He helped Armando Castagna when he first began riding speedway, giving him advice and technical support. In 1981, he won the Argentine Championship.

In the late 1970s he began to develop his own speedway motor. The first version was produced in 1979. The engine has become known as the GM (his initials). The first major success was achieved in 1983 when Egon Muller won the 1983 Speedway World Championship. Since then the GM has won more than 40 world speedway and longtrack championships.

References

External links
 gmengines.net
 The GM story

1944 births
Living people
Italian speedway riders
Sportspeople from Vicenza
Wolverhampton Wolves riders